Canned Fishing is a 1938 Our Gang short comedy film directed by Gordon Douglas. It was the 162nd Our Gang short (163rd episode, 74th talking short, and 75th talking episode) that was released.

Plot
Again concocting an elaborate hooky-playing scheme, Spanky places a block of ice on the chest of his pal Alfalfa, who spent the night with him at his house. The strategy this time is to convince their mothers that Alfalfa has a bad cold or the flu, and that Spanky must remain by his side to nurse him back to health. In fact, the boys plan to go fishing the moment their mothers' backs are turned—and the scheme might have worked, had Buckwheat and Porky not spilled the beans to Spanky's mother.

Vowing to teach the boys a lesson, she orders Spanky and Alfalfa to remain in the house all day and look after Spanky's kid brother Junior. This turns out to be a major mistake when, while trying to clean Junior's clothes, the boys end up locked in a steam cabinet, while poor Buckwheat finds himself stuck in the washing machine's rinse cycle. When Spanky's mother returns, the three boys run to school.

Cast

The Gang
 George McFarland as Spanky
 Carl Switzer as Alfalfa
 Billie Thomas as Buckwheat
 Eugene Lee as Porky

Additional cast
 Gary Jasgur as Junior
 Wilma Cox as Spanky's mother

See also
 Our Gang filmography

References

External links

1938 films
American black-and-white films
Films directed by Gordon Douglas
Hal Roach Studios short films
1938 comedy films
Our Gang films
1930s American films